Muhamedin Kullashi  Muhamedin Kulaši, born November 29, 1949) is an Albanian philosopher and Professor in a University of Paris-VIII (Université de Paris-VIII) and politician. From  to  he was the Republic of Kosovo's first ambassador to France.

Notes

References

1949 births
Living people
21st-century Albanian philosophers
Kosovan diplomats
Ambassadors of Kosovo to France